Celebrate This Heartbeat is an album by Randy Stonehill, released in 1984, on Myrrh Records.

Track listing
All songs written by Randy Stonehill except where otherwise noted.
Side one
 "Overture: Celebrate This Heartbeat"  (Randy Stonehill, Tom Howard) – 3:25
 "Still, Small Voice"  – 4:04
 "Celebrate This Heartbeat"  – 4:08
 "Modern Myth"  – 3:51
 "Who Will Save the Children"  – 5:27
Side two
 "When I Look to the Mountains"  – 3:41
 "Allison"  – 3:18
 "Watcha Gonna Do About That"  – 3:19
 "Stop the World"  – 4:34
 "I'll Remember You"  – 4:26

This album has not been released on CD.

Personnel 
 Randy Stonehill – acoustic guitars, all vocals (1, 3, 6-10), lead vocals (2, 4, 5), backing vocals (2, 4, 5), "Ventures" guitar (9), rhythm section and vocal arrangements 
 Tom Howard – acoustic piano, electric grand piano, synthesizers, timpani, orchestral arrangements and conductor, backing vocals (2, 5)
 Danny Jacob – electric guitars
 Mark Heard – electric 12-string guitar, harmonica (3), slide guitar solos (7, 8), bass (8, 9)
 Tim Chandler – bass (1-7, 10)
 John Mehler – drums (1-8, 10)
 Rick Geragi – congas, bongos, percussion, DMX programming (9)
 Jay "Shotgun" Leslie – baritone saxophone, tenor saxophone, flute
 John Clarke – flute, English horn
 Barbara Northcutt – oboe
 Darrel Gardner – French horn
 Michael Amorosi – harp
 Barry Miller Kaye – rhythm section and vocal arrangements 
 Dori Howard – backing vocals (2, 5)
 David Edwards – backing vocals (4)
 Tonio K. – backing vocals (4)
 Phil Keaggy – lead vocals (5)
 Rachel Anderson, Amy Eason, Audrey Floyd and Moses Toth – children's voices (5)

Production 
 Produced by Barry Miller Kaye
 Engineered by Mark Heard
 Second Engineer – Dan Reed
 Recorded and Mixed at Fingerprint Recorders (Montrose, California).
 Cross-Fades and Editing at Wildor Brothers Recording Studios (Los Angeles, California).
 Mastered by Steve Hall at Future Disc Systems, Inc. (North Hollywood, California).
 Art Direction – Tim Aldersen
 Photography – Aaron Rapoport

References

1984 albums
Randy Stonehill albums